Livio Bassi (8 October 1918 – 2 April 1941) was an Italian aviator, and a fighter ace of World War II.

Early life 
Bassi was born in Trapani, Sicily, in 1918, was a cadet of the prestigious Nunziatella military academy between 1932–35, and entered the Italian  Accademia Aeronautica (Air Force Academy) in 1936. In 1939 he was made Sottotenente (2nd Lieutenant) of Regia Aeronautica and was assigned to the 395th Squadron (160nd Fighter Wing).

Second World War 
In 1940 he was promoted to full Lieutenant.

In this unit, with Fiat G.50, he took part in his first military mission, on November 4, 1940, in Jannina (Greece). In December 1940 and January 1941 destroyed four enemy planes in combat.

On 20 February 1941 Pat Pattle, a flying ace of the Royal Air Force, flying Hurricane Mk I V7724, was leading a group of six Hurricanes escorting 16 Blenheim light bombers — eight of No. 84 Squadron RAF, six of No. 211 Squadron and three of No. 30 Squadron RAF — to Berat. Fiat G.50bis from the 361a and 395a Squadriglia, 154° Autonomo Gruppo were scrambled from Berat airfield, but they were attacked by the higher altitude Hurricanes. Pattle led his section straight towards four Fiat G.50s and selected the leading aircraft as his own target. It was the first time he had fired the eight guns of the Hurricane, and the G.50 exploded. The Fiat G.50 was from 154° Gruppo and it was the first Hurricane victory that Pattle would claim. The plane of Bassi was hit in this battle, after knocking down two British planes. 

He could land even with the damaged plane, but the aircraft caught fire burning. Bassi died a few weeks after at the military hospital in Rome.
A Gold Medal of Military Valor awarded posthumously.

Memorials 
The Airport Trapani-Chinisia was named in 1949 to Livio Bassi, and after named the military Trapani–Birgi Airport.

References

Bibliography
 Baker, E.C.R. Ace of Aces: The Story of Squadron Leader Pat Pattle, greatest fighter ace of the R.A.F. London: William Kimber, 1965. 
 Shores, Christopher, Brian Cull and Maria Malizia. Air War for Yugoslavia, Greece and Crete: 1940–41. London: Grub Street, 1992. .
 Thomas, Andrew. Hurricane Aces 1941–45. Oxford: Osprey, 2003.  
 Chris Dunning, Combat Units of the Regia Aeronautica. Italia Air Force 1940-1943, Oxford University Press, 1988

See also
List of World War II flying aces

1918 births
1941 deaths
People from Trapani
Italian World War II pilots
Recipients of the Gold Medal of Military Valor
Italian military personnel killed in World War II
Regia Aeronautica personnel of World War II